Hackney London Borough Council is the local government authority for the London Borough of Hackney,  London, England, one of 32 London borough councils. The council is unusual in the United Kingdom local government system in that its executive function is controlled by a directly elected mayor of Hackney, currently Philip Glanville of the Labour Party. Hackney comprises 19 wards, each electing three councillors. Following the May 2018 election, Hackney London Borough Council consists of 52 Labour Party councillors and 5 Conservative Party councillors. The council was created by the London Government Act 1963 whereby it replaced three local authorities: Hackney Metropolitan Borough Council, Shoreditch Metropolitan Borough Council and Stoke Newington Metropolitan Borough Council.

History
There have previously been a number of local authorities responsible for the Hackney area. The current local authority was first elected in 1964, a year before formally coming into its powers and prior to the creation of the London Borough of Hackney on 1 April 1965. Hackney London Borough Council replaced Hackney Metropolitan Borough Council, Shoreditch Metropolitan Borough Council and Stoke Newington Metropolitan Borough Council. All three had been created in 1900; the ancient parishes of Hackney and Stoke Newington were previously governed by vestries, but together were united as the Hackney District of the Metropolis from 1855 to 1894. Shoreditch was also an ancient parish and was governed by a vestry until becoming a metropolitan borough in 1900.

It was envisaged that through the London Government Act 1963 Hackney as a London local authority would share power with the Greater London Council. The split of powers and functions meant that the Greater London Council was responsible for "wide area" services such as fire, ambulance, flood prevention, and refuse disposal; with the local authorities responsible for "personal" services such as social care, libraries, cemeteries and refuse collection. This arrangement lasted until 1986 when Hackney London Borough Council gained responsibility for some services that had been provided by the Greater London Council, such as waste disposal. Hackney became an education authority in 1990. Since 2000 the Greater London Authority has taken some responsibility for highways and planning control from the council, but within the English local government system the council remains a "most purpose" authority in terms of the available range of powers and functions.

Powers and functions
The local authority derives its powers and functions from the London Government Act 1963 and subsequent legislation, and has the powers and functions of a London borough council. It sets council tax and as a billing authority also collects precepts for Greater London Authority functions and business rates. It sets planning policies which complement Greater London Authority and national policies, and decides on almost all planning applications accordingly.  It is a local education authority  and is also responsible for council housing, social services, libraries, waste collection and disposal, traffic, and most roads and environmental health.

Elections

Electoral arrangements

Wards were established for Hackney when it came into existence on 1 April 1965. The first elections of ward councillors took place in 1964. These boundaries were also used for the 1968, 1971 and 1974 elections. For the 1978 elections the ward boundaries were revised. These boundaries were then also used at the 1982, 1986 and 1990 elections.

For the May 1994 elections there were minor adjustments to London borough boundaries, which affected the area and population of some Hackney wards. These boundaries were also used at the 1998 elections. The current ward boundaries came into effect at the May 2002 elections. They were also used at the 2006 and 2010 elections. The ward boundaries were redrawn for the 2014 election.

Summary results of elections

References

Local authorities in London
London borough councils
Politics of the London Borough of Hackney
Mayor and cabinet executives
Local education authorities in England
Billing authorities in England